Michael Raymond Easton (born January 25, 1984) is an American mixed martial artist, who is perhaps best known for his stint in the Bantamweight division of the Ultimate Fighting Championship. A professional competitor since 2003, he was the reigning Ultimate Warrior Challenge Bantamweight Champion when he joined the UFC.

Background
Easton was born and raised in Washington D.C. Growing up dyslexic in a rough area of the city, Easton sought an outlet through martial arts, beginning with Taekwondo from a young age and going on to earn a black belt. At the age of 17, Easton began training in Brazilian jiu-jitsu under the tutelage of Lloyd Irvin. Easton was also a World Kickboxing Association World Champion and WKA U.S. National Champion, and won a bronze medal at the 2008 Brown Belt Brazilian Jiu-Jitsu Mundials.

Mixed martial arts career

Early career
Easton made his professional debut in 2003 for Reality Fighting at the age of 20. He fought and defeated Anibal Torres via unanimous decision. Almost a year after his debut, Easton returned to defeat Jason Taylor, again winning the fight via unanimous decision.

In 2007, Easton was awarded his black belt in Brazilian jiu-jitsu under Lloyd Irvin. That year Easton also lost for the first time. During a bout against Reynaldo Duarte, Easton misjudged a kick taking the full force of the blow on his elbow. He recalled the injury in an interview with The Washington Post. "My arm just flopped backward, I'm having a full-blown conversation with my coach while this guy's trying to punch me in the face. I'm like, 'Man, my arm's not working. What's going on with my arm?' This guy's just hitting me in the face....I wasn't worried about him. I don't fear no man." Because of the severity of the injury his corner was forced to throw in the towel and Easton was immediately rushed to the hospital. After claiming a 5–1 record, Easton signed with Virginia-based promotion, Ultimate Warrior Challenge. He fought twice for the promotion before earning himself a title shot against Justin Robbins. Easton submitted Robbins in the third round of their five round fight, winning him the bantamweight championship.

His first defense of the title was against Josh Ferguson at UWC 6: Capital Punishment in April 2009. Easton won the fight in the first round via submission due to a guillotine choke.

Easton then fought former WEC title holder, Chase Beebe. The fight went all five rounds. However, Easton won the fight via split decision, and retained his title. The crowd heavily booed the results, and the fight went on to be named Sherdog's Robbery of the Year.

Ultimate Fighting Championship
After nearly a two-year hiatus from competing, Easton signed with the UFC on July 26, 2011. His promotional debut was expected to take place against Jeff Hougland on October 1, 2011, at UFC on Versus 6. However, Hougland was forced out of the bout with an injury and replaced by fellow UFC newcomer Byron Bloodworth. Bloodworth failed to make the 135 pound weight limit, thus the match was changed to a 138-pound catchweight bout, with Bloodworth being fined for the infraction. Easton won by TKO in the second round.

Easton was expected to face Ken Stone on January 20, 2012, at UFC on FX 1.  However, Stone was forced out of the bout with an injury and replaced by promotional newcomer Jared Papazian. Easton won the bout via majority decision.

Easton was expected to face Yves Jabouin on May 15, 2012, at UFC on Fuel TV: Korean Zombie vs. Poirier. However, Easton was forced out of the bout with an injury and replaced by Jeff Hougland.

Easton fought Ivan Menjivar on July 7, 2012, at UFC 148 and won the fight via unanimous decision.

Easton was expected to face T.J. Dillashaw on December 8, 2012, at UFC on Fox 5.  However, Dillashaw was forced out of the bout with an injury and Bryan Caraway was briefly linked as a replacement.  Caraway himself was injured and was replaced by Raphael Assunção. He lost the fight via unanimous decision.

Easton next faced Brad Pickett on April 6, 2013, at UFC on Fuel TV 9.  He lost the back-and-forth fight via split decision.  Despite the loss on the scorecards, Easton earned his first Fight of the Night bonus with this bout.

Easton faced T.J. Dillashaw on January 15, 2014, at UFC Fight Night 35. He lost the fight via unanimous decision.

Easton faced Yves Jabouin on June 14, 2014, at UFC 174. He lost the fight via unanimous decision, and was subsequently released from the promotion shortly after.

Championships and accomplishments
Ultimate Fighting Championship
Fight of the Night (One time) vs. Brad Pickett 
Ultimate Warrior Challenge
UWC Bantamweight Championship (One time)

Mixed martial arts record

|-
|Loss
|align=center|13–6
|Jesse Stirn
|Decision (split)
|Shogun Fights XVI
|
|align=center|3
|align=center|5:00
|Baltimore, Maryland, United States
|For Shogun Fights Bantamweight Championship.
|-
|Loss
|align=center|13–5
|Yves Jabouin
|Decision (unanimous)
|UFC 174
|
|align=center|3
|align=center|5:00
|Vancouver, British Columbia, Canada
|
|-
|Loss
|align=center|13–4
|T.J. Dillashaw
|Decision (unanimous)
|UFC Fight Night: Rockhold vs. Philippou
|
|align=center|3
|align=center|5:00
|Duluth, Georgia, United States
|
|-
|Loss
|align=center|13–3
|Brad Pickett
|Decision (split)
|UFC on Fuel TV: Mousasi vs. Latifi
|
|align=center|3
|align=center|5:00
|Stockholm, Sweden
|
|-
|Loss
|align=center|13–2
|Raphael Assunção
|Decision (unanimous)
|UFC on Fox: Henderson vs. Diaz
|
|align=center|3
|align=center|5:00
|Seattle, Washington, United States
|
|-
|Win
|align=center|13–1
|Ivan Menjivar
|Decision (unanimous)
|UFC 148
|
|align=center|3
|align=center|5:00
|Las Vegas, Nevada, United States
|
|-
|Win
|align=center|12–1
|Jared Papazian
|Decision (majority)
|UFC on FX: Guillard vs. Miller
|
|align=center|3
|align=center|5:00
|Nashville, Tennessee, United States
|
|-
|Win
|align=center|11–1
|Byron Bloodworth
|TKO (knee to the body and punches)
|UFC Live: Cruz vs. Johnson
|
|align=center|2
|align=center|4:52
|Washington, D.C., United States
|
|-
|Win
|align=center|10–1
|Chase Beebe
|Decision (split)
|UWC 7: Redemption
|
|align=center|5
|align=center|5:00
|Fairfax, Virginia, United States
|
|-
|Win
|align=center|9–1
|Josh Ferguson
|Submission (guillotine choke)
|UWC 6: Capital Punishment
| 
|align=center|1
|align=center|4:06
|Fairfax, Virginia, United States
|
|-
|Win
|align=center|8–1
|Justin Robbins
|Submission (guillotine choke)
|UWC 5: Man 'O' War
| 
|align=center|3
|align=center|4:44
|Fairfax, Virginia, United States
|
|-
|Win
|align=center|7–1
|John Dodson
|Decision (split)
|UWC 4: Confrontation
| 
|align=center|3
|align=center|5:00
|Fairfax, Virginia, United States
|
|-
|Win
|align=center|6–1
|Gerald Lovato
|KO (punch)
|UWC 3: Invasion
| 
|align=center|1
|align=center|2:48
|Fairfax, Virginia, United States
|
|-
|Loss
|align=center|5–1
|Reynaldo Walter Duarte
|TKO (corner stoppage)
|Combat Sport Challenge
| 
|align=center|1
|align=center|1:36
|Richmond, Virginia, United States
|
|-
|Win
|align=center|5–0
|Hudson Rocha
|KO (punch)
|Fury FC 2: Final Combat
| 
|align=center|2
|align=center|0:45
|São Paulo, Brazil
|
|-
|Win
|align=center|4–0
|Rick Desper
|Decision (unanimous)
|Reality Fighting 12: Return to Boardwalk Hall
| 
|align=center|3
|align=center|4:00
|Atlantic City, New Jersey, United States
|Bantamweight debut; Won Reality Fighting Bantamweight Championship.
|-
|Win
|align=center|3–0
|Jay Isip
|TKO (punches)
|Reality Fighting 6
|
|align=center|2
|align=center|1:42
|Wildwood, New Jersey, United States
|Won Reality Fighting Featherweight Championship.
|-
|Win
|align=center|2–0
|Jason Taylor
|Decision (unanimous)
|Combat Sport Challenge
| 
|align=center|2
|align=center|5:00
|Richmond, Virginia, United States
|
|-
|Win
|align=center|1–0
|Anibal Torres
|Decision (unanimous)
|Reality Fighting 3
| 
|align=center|3
|align=center|5:00
|Bayonne, New Jersey, United States
|

See also
List of male mixed martial artists

References

External links
Official UFC Profile

Lloyd Irvin MMA Website

1984 births
American male mixed martial artists
American practitioners of Brazilian jiu-jitsu
Bantamweight mixed martial artists
Mixed martial artists utilizing taekwondo
Mixed martial artists utilizing Brazilian jiu-jitsu
Living people
People from Camp Springs, Maryland
Sportspeople from Maryland
Sportspeople from Washington, D.C.
American male taekwondo practitioners
People awarded a black belt in Brazilian jiu-jitsu
Ultimate Fighting Championship male fighters